Hastingford Cutting is a  geological Site of Special Scientific Interest south of Crowborough in East Sussex. It is a Geological Conservation Review site.

This site exposes rocks dating to the Hastings Beds of the Early Cretaceous. It has coarse sandstone with pebbles and fossil charcoal in a channel which is interpreted as part of a braided system. It underlies a layer which is thought to be part of the shore of a lake.

The site is on the side of Hastingford Lane.

References

Sites of Special Scientific Interest in East Sussex
Geological Conservation Review sites
Hadlow Down